The H.M. Gousha Company was one of the "Big Three" major producers of road maps and atlases in the United States during the 25 years following World War II, making maps for free distribution by oil companies and auto clubs. Following the end of the free-road-map era, Gousha distributed maps through retailers, and published a number of travel guides and other travel-related books.

Brands under the Gousha imprint from the 1970s onward included Chek-Chart and Fastmap, one of the first lines of laminate-encapsulated maps.

History
Harry Mathias Gousha, a sales executive for Rand McNally, left that company in 1926 to start his own map company out of Chicago, quickly becoming Rand McNally's chief competitor by offering the Touraide: a spiral-bound book with road maps, points of interest, and accommodations that was custom assembled for individual buyers. 

In 1947, the company moved its headquarters to 2001 The Alameda in San Jose, California.  H.M. Gousha Map Company was acquired by the Times Mirror Company in 1961, and then Simon & Schuster in 1987. In Gousha's later years, the company operated out of Comfort TX. Analog maps (large plate, hand etched negatives) and digital maps were produced out of this office. Predominantly, road maps were being produced with a catalog containing the major cities throughout the US. Hundreds, if not thousands, of sources were studied to continually improve and update the cartographic library for  veracity of information and viability of sales. Maps could be found in major bookstores, gas stations, and under other companies imprint.  Finally, the company was purchased by Rand McNally in 1996; by then, Viacom had become the parent of Simon & Schuster. Its production facility in Texas was closed and virtually all workers laid off. The Gousha artwork became part of the Rand McNally archive, and much of the company's archives were turned over to the Newberry Library.

References

External links
 Collection of Gousha Maps – Chicago Newberry Library

Defunct mass media companies of the United States
Publishing companies established in 1926
Map companies of the United States
Defunct companies based in Chicago
Companies based in San Jose, California
Defunct companies based in Illinois
Defunct companies based in California
Former Viacom subsidiaries
Design companies established in 1926
1926 establishments in Illinois
Publishing companies disestablished in 1996
1996 disestablishments in California